DesignSpark PCB is a free electronic design automation software package for printed circuit boards.  Although there is no charge for the software, the user must register with the website to unlock the program and it displays advertisements which must be acknowledged before the user can begin working.

Background
DesignSpark PCB resulted from a collaboration between electronics distributor RS Components and EDA software developer 'Number One Systems', being a fork of their long- established EDA Easy-PC. Electronic design automation (EDA) software is a sub-class of computer-aided design (CAD) software.

Projects
Projects are used in DesignSpark PCB to organise design files.  A project can have an unlimited number of schematic sheets and one PCB layout file.

Schematic capture
DesignSpark PCB has a Schematic editor.  Schematics are used to draw up circuit diagrams and connections.  A given project can have multiple schematic sheets that together combine to form the complete design.

There are some useful third party libraries that can be added.

PCB layout
Schematics are translated to a PCB layout file with a PCB Wizard.  A PCB layout editor is then used to refine the physical layout of the printed circuit board.  A design may have several iterations before a finalised printed circuit board is passed for production.

Autorouter
DesignSpark PCB includes an auto-router which automatically places tracks between components on a PCB layout.  Components can also be auto-placed.

DesignSpark PCB produces Gerber and Excellon drill files. These standard files are accepted by PCB fabrication companies and are used to build a printed circuit board.

DesignSpark PCB Pro

DesignSpark PCB Pro is a paid upgrade from the free DesignSpark PCB software and a free trial is available to test the additional functionality. It is aimed at professional electronic design engineers of SMEs with an expanded feature set compared to the free DesignSpark PCB software.

Background 
DesignSpark PCB Pro also resulted from a collaboration between electronics distributor RS Components and EDA software developer 'WestDev Ltd'.

Features 
DesignSpark PCB Pro has specialised tools to aid professionals with customising and managing large projects involving multi-layer PCBs. Noteworthy features referred to on the developer's website include:
 Blind and Buried Vias - to connect between different layers of a complex printed circuit board
 Fully configurable design rules editor and checker - to verify a circuit design and pass quality checks for production
 Hierarchical Schematic Design - split multi-sheet schematics into building blocks to make them readable and manageable
 Panel design editor - visualise and manage assembly of finished PCB designs prior to manufacturing
 Variant Manager - to specify different design variants to meet global market requirements
 Automatic shape-based and gridless router
 Advanced routing modes – trunk routing for differential pairs and buses, pull tight, auto mitre, and auto neck tracks
 Dual screen support
 Cross-hatch copper pours, teardrops, bullet, and asymmetric pad shapes are supported.

See also

 Comparison of EDA Software
 DesignSpark Mechanical

References

Further reading
"Профессиональная работ ав САПР DesignSpark PCB" (English title: Professional work CAD DesignSpark PCB.) 
"RS Components Launches Professional Upgrade to Free Online PCB Design Tool in North America". GlobeNewswire.com
"RS Components upgrades DesignSpark PCB with high-end productivity tools". EEJournal.com.

External links
 Official DesignSpark PCB website
 Official DesignSpark PCB Forum
 Official DesignSpark PCB Pro Website
 Official DesignSpark PCB Pro Forum
 Official DesignSpark PCB Pro User Guide

Electronic design automation software